Ephippiandra madagascariensis is a species of flowering plant endemic to Madagascar, where it is known as ambora.

Range and habitat
Ephippiandra madagascariensis is native to northern and eastern Madagascar. It grows in humid and subhumid lowland and montane forests, from sea level to 1,800 meters elevation. It is typically found on lateritic soils.

There are 27 known subpopulations.

Conservation and threats
The species' forest habitat is under threat from shifting agriculture, firewood collection, charcoal production, fire, logging, and timber harvesting.

The species is found in many protected areas, including Ambositra Vondrozo Forest Corridor, Analamazaotra, Andohahela, Anjanaharibe Sud, Anjozorobe Angavo, Ankeniheny-Zahamena Corridor, Kalambatritra, Loky-Manambato, Makira, Manongarivo, Marojejy, Montagne d'Ambre (including Amber Forest Reserve), Nosy Mangabe, Ranomafana, and Zahamena.

Uses
Its timber is used for fine carpentry.

References

madagascarensis
Endemic flora of Madagascar
Flora of the Madagascar lowland forests
Flora of the Madagascar subhumid forests